Joe Walcott (March 13, 1873 – October 1, 1935), also known as Barbados Joe Walcott to distinguish him from the more contemporary American boxer known by the same name, was a Bajan professional boxer who reigned as the World Welterweight Champion from 1901 to 1906, becoming the first black man ever to capture the title. He was elected to The Ring Boxing Hall of Fame in 1955 and the International Boxing Hall of Fame in 1991.

Walcott was a formidable fighter with exceptional power to his punch. His manager was Tom O'Rourke. In evidence, his wins were an impressive 60% by knockout.

Nat Fleischer rated Walcott as the greatest welterweight of all time, and in 2003 he was included in the Ring Magazine's list of 100 greatest punchers of all time.  He was elected to The Ring Boxing Hall of Fame in 1955 and the International Boxing Hall of Fame in 1991.

"Barbados" Joe Walcott was the idol of the more contemporary boxer Arnold Cream, who adopted his idol's real name as his own, going by Jersey Joe Walcott in the ring.

Early life and career 
Walcott was born on March 13, 1873, in British Guiana but migrated to Barbados at a young age. As a youngster he set out to see the world and got a job as a cabin boy on a ship sailing to Boston that arrived around 1887. He soon settled in Boston as a piano mover and porter and took other odd jobs as well. Later, he landed a job in a gym and became popular with even the best of the boxers as an able opponent before turning professional. His amateur boxing and wrestling years spanned roughly from 1887 to 1889.

Professional career 
The focus of his early professional boxing years, between 1890 and 1896, were in the areas of Boston and New York City. One of his more noteworthy bouts included a 15-round draw with Mysterious Billy Smith and a 15-round loss to George "Kid Lavigne" in March and December 1895, respectively. He lost to Welsh-born middleweight Tommy West in 1894 and 1897. West acted as a sparring partner for Walcott in late October 1904.

First attempts at the world lightweight and welterweight championships 
Walcott first challenged for the lightweight championship on October 29, 1897, at the Lennox Athletic Club in New York, but he was TKO'ed by the champion George "Kid" Lavigne in the 12th round. He was also unsuccessful in his first attempt to win the world welterweight championship when Mysterious Billy Smith outpointed him on December 6, 1898. Walcott fought Smith, likely his most frequent opponent,  six times in his career.

On February 23, 1900, Walcott met the Jewish light heavyweight Joe Choynski, winning in a surprising seventh-round TKO, though outweighed by 16 pounds and conceding his opponent a full foot advantage in height. Likely sensing the need for a quick start against his gifted opponent, Walcott sent Choynski to the mat five times in the first round and was the aggressor throughout the bout. Choynski, a 3-1 betting favorite before the bout, suddenly became a 2-1 underdog after the bell ending the first round. Walcott seemed to have a slight advantage in the second, though Choynski landed a solid blow. By the third round, Walcott pressed his advantage with a superior defense and landed blows nearly at will before the sound of the bell. The fourth seemed even and the fifth entirely in Walcott's favor, but in the sixth Walcott cut Choynski's right eye. Walcott sent Choynski to the floor again in the seventh, battering his clearly exhausted opponent. Stopping the final round 38 seconds in, the referee said later that he "felt another blow to Choynski would have put him out."

On September 27, 1901, Walcott impressively defeated Irish boxer George Gardner in a twenty-round points decision at the Mechanic's Pavilion in San Francisco, California.  The pre-fight betting was light before the match with Gardner a 10-8 favorite. Gardner, at just under six feet, and holding a serious reach advantage over Walcott, would briefly hold the light heavyweight championship of the world from July through November 1903.  Walcott was the aggressor throughout the bout, landing more clean blows, though there was a great deal of clinching and wrestling throughout the furious bout, likely a result of the mismatch in reach between the two opponents.  In the first round, Walcott brought Gardner to his knees from a left and right to the head for a nine count, though Gardner returned to the fighting unfazed.

Taking the world welterweight championship from Rube Ferns, 1901 
Walcott won the world welterweight title on December 18, 1901 in Buffalo, New York, from reigning champion James "Rube" Ferns achieving a technical knockout in the fifth round. Ferns, from the reaction of the Buffalo crowd as he entered the ring, appeared to be the favorite. Walcott sent Ferns to the floor twice in the fifth round, the first a solid blow to the jaw. Rube took the count both times. At the end, the referee stopped the bout to prevent a knockout. Ferns began to weaken as early as the third round, and in the fourth Walcott sent Ferns through the ropes. The bout featured a clinch in the fourth round that brought both boxers to the mat, possibly a result of a tiring Walcott attempting to counter Fern's six-inch height advantage and superior reach. The match brought roughly 2,000 spectators to the clubhouse, and tickets ranged from a respectable $2 to $5. "Walcott battered down Ferns with terrific body blows, and right and left swings to the head. To save Ferns from being completely knocked out, Referee McBride stopped the bout." - Toronto Star.

After the fight, Rube Ferns stated "Well, he won, and I have nothing to say against it. I don't know anybody at the weight - no, nor a good deal above it - that can beat him."

On June 23, 1902, Walcott faced Tommy West in a title defense of his world welterweight title, facing off against West for the sixth time. In their previous encounter in August of 1900, the fight had gone as such according to a newspaper called the Durango Democrat. "The bout had gone eleven rounds very much in Wolcott's favor, as he had punished West very badly about the body and head and had him in a very weakened condition. When the bell rang for the twelfth round, to the surprise of everybody, Wolcott refused to go on, claiming he had injured his left arm. Referee Charlie White, suspecting crookedness, insisted upon Wolcott continuing, but the negro refused to do so, which left White no alternative other than to declare West the winner. There was quite a large sum of money wagered, with West as favorite and the referee is very outspoken in reference to Wolcott's peculiar actions. Manager Kennedy, on behalf of the club, announced that Wolcott's share of the money would not be given to him, but would be donated to some charitable institution. " (Durango Democrat)"  With their first 5 fights having been in America, they fought their final battle, for the world welterweight championship, at the National Sporting Club, Covent Garden in London, England. Walcott clearly outpointed the Welsh fighter and retained his championship with a 15 round points decision victory overseas.

On June 18, 1903, Walcott fought Young Peter Jackson, an exceptional black contender to a twenty-round draw, in Portland, Oregon, in a match billed as a world welterweight championship. The title did not change hands due to the draw decision.  Walcott would later lose to Jackson on June 10, 1904, in a fourth-round knockout during a non-title fight in Baltimore, after receiving a punch to the stomach. Up until the time of the knockout, Walcott was considered to have a slight lead over Jackson, as his blows to the head and neck of his opponent were not landing with much force. Walcott had previously fought Jackson twice in the winter of 1902 to a win and a draw.

Controversy vs. Dixie Kid in title match, 1904 
On April 4, 1904 Walcott defended his title against black contender Dixie Kid. He was winning the fight handily when the referee disqualified Walcott for no apparent reason in the final seconds of the 20th round. "Duck Sullivan," the referee, was a last-minute replacement, and Walcott protested the choice before the bout began. In the one-sided contest, Walcott appeared to have a clear advantage in all but the seventh round. Many in the crowd were shocked with the decision, and Walcott himself was immediately angered at referee Sullivan, who made the call. The match was disregarded as a title bout when it was discovered, not surprisingly, that referee Sullivan had bet on Dixie Kid to win the match.

Mid-career, and loss of the world welterweight championship to Honey Mellody, 1906

Historic draw with Sam Langford, 1904 

Walcott fought the exceptional black boxer Sam Langford in a non-title fight before a modest crowd of 1,200 in Manchester, New Hampshire on September 5, 1904, with the fight ending in a fifteen-round draw.

Langford had the better of the bout for the first seven rounds and staged an excellent defense, but in the remaining eight rounds, Walcott fought furiously in a close battle where the crowd could not anticipate the outcome til the referee's decision. In the third round, Langford brought Walcott to one knee with a blow to the jaw.

Historic draw with lightweight champion Joe Gans, 1904 

Walcott met world lightweight champion Joe Gans in a non-title fight at Woodward's Pavilion in San Francisco on September 30, 1904, and scored a draw after 20 thrilling rounds. Many in the crowd believed Gans should have received the decision. The lightweight champion gained a lead from the second till the tenth, using his right almost exclusively on the body of Walcott. Walcott, however, put tremendous force behind his blows, weakening the lightweight Gans in several points in the bout.

After the tenth, Gans became the superior boxer, avoiding the blows of Walcott and connecting with solid rights and lefts to the face.  In the nineteenth round, Gans landed a solid blow to Walcott's jaw that might have ended the fight. In the final round, Gans showed dominance in the in-fighting, though neither fighter took a clear lead. An examination after the fight showed that Walcott had broken his right elbow in the fourth round, though he fought on valiantly.

After the Gans fight, on October 18, 1904, Walcott accidentally shot himself in the hand, losing several fingers. Walcott took a year off of boxing to recover from the injury, but it may have effectively limited his remaining years as a world class prizefighter. Walcott, however, continued to box until 1911.

Loss of the world welterweight title to Honey Mellody, 1906 

Before a crowd of 3,000, Walcott officially lost the world welterweight championship on October 16, 1906 against William "Honey" Mellody at the Lincoln Athletic Club in Chelsea, Massachusetts. Falling to a twelfth-round technical knockout, Walcott quit the bout, claiming his left arm had been injured in the ninth round. In the first round Walcott scored a knockdown. Melody, fighting cautiously against the reigning champion, landed mostly body blows throughout the remainder of the fight, but scored enough to appear to dominate. In the sixth round, Mellody landed a strong right to the jaw which backed Walcott against the ropes. In the eleventh, Mellody landed punches at will, and in the final round he landed a flurry of rights to the stomach before Walcott retreated to his corner before the bell ending the bout.

Returning to the ring on January 15, 1907, Walcott lost a fifteen-round decision on points to Mike Donavan in Providence, Rhode Island. Though winning only a few of his remaining bouts, Walcott succeeded in twice beating George Cole, a competent hard hitting middleweight from Philadelphia, in December 1907 and January 1908. In fact, of their December meeting in Philadelphia, one source noted that "with the exception of the third round when Cole sent over some very hard punches, the "battle was Walcott's all the way."

On January 7, 1908, Walcott lost to a noteworthy opponent, Jimmy Gardner, in twelve rounds at the Armory in Boston. Gardner would become a world welterweight contender against Mike "Twin" Sullivan in April of that year. New York's Evening World stated that Walcott's performance "did not come up to expectations" and that Gardner's win "was one of the easiest victories he ever earned." On November 2, 1911, Walcott fought his last reported bout against Tom Sawyer in Lowell, Massachusetts. He walked out of the ring before the bell at the end of the one-sided 12-round technical knockout, and said to the crowd, "I'm 40 years old and I guess I'm done with this game."

Later life 
Walcott squandered a fortune earned in the ring and eventually found employment as a custodian at the old Madison Square Garden. He died at 62 on October 4, 1935. He was reported missing in December 1935, by his daughter. He had been last seen around Mansfield, Ohio, on a trip he was taking to find work in Hollywood. It was later reported he died in a car accident in Massillon, Ohio, fifty miles from Mansfield.

It was believed that Joe was walking along Route 30 in the village of Dalton, Ohio (8 miles west of Massillon) and was struck and killed by a car. His body was not claimed and the Village of Dalton buried him at the edge of the cemetery. In 1955 a headstone that reads "Ex Worlds Champion Joe Walcott 1873-1935" was erected on the grave.

Professional boxing record
All information in this section is derived from BoxRec, unless otherwise stated.

Official record

All newspaper decisions are officially regarded as “no decision” bouts and are not counted in the win/loss/draw column.

Unofficial record

Record with the inclusion of newspaper decisions in the win/loss/draw column.

Boxing honors and achievements 

|- 

|-

See also 
Lineal championship
List of welterweight boxing champions

References

External links 

Barbadian male boxers
Welterweight boxers
World boxing champions
World welterweight boxing champions
1873 births
1935 deaths
Guyanese male boxers
International Boxing Hall of Fame inductees